The Hurtsboro race riot was conflict between Black and White residents of Hurtsboro, Alabama in the final days of 1920.

Background

Violence against Blacks were and other incidents of civil unrest were nothing new to early 20th century America. The country had recently gone through what is now known as the American Red Summer of 1919. Attacks on black communities and white oppression spread to more than three dozen cities and counties. In most cases, white mobs attacked African American neighborhoods. In some cases, black community groups resisted the attacks, especially in Chicago and Washington, D.C. Most deaths occurred in rural areas during events like the Elaine race riot in Arkansas, where an estimated 100 to 240 blacks and 5 whites were killed. Other major events of Red Summer were the Chicago race riot and Washington D.C. Race Riot, which caused 38 and 39 deaths, respectively. Both riots had many more non-fatal injuries and extensive property damage reaching up into the millions of dollars.

In December of 1920, the wife of a white farmer in Hurtsboro was allegedly assaulted by a Black man. Her husband alerted by her screams ran to her aid but was knocked out by the assailant. While shaken he was able to make it to a phone and called the authorities who quickly created a posse led by Deputy Sheriff Boss W.E. Dozier of Russell County, Alabama.

Posse formed

Deputy Sheriff Boss Dozier and his posse had information that the man they were looking for was in a house about four  from Pittsview, Alabama. As they approached the house, on December 29, 1920, they were fired upon by the men inside wounding several men of the posse.
 Some members of the posse who were wounded were George Hart, L.A. Brown and two brothers named Bagley. Faced with a standoff, weapons and ammunition were quickly sent from the nearby city of Columbus, Georgia.

Once reinforcements and more weapons had arrived the house was stormed and the men inside taken under custody. Two of the black men captured were identified as L.C. the Cleveland Hill brothers.

Bibliography 
Notes

References  

   
 

 
1920 in Alabama 
1920 riots
December 1920 events in the United States
African-American history between emancipation and the civil rights movement
History of racism in Alabama
Racially motivated violence against African Americans 
Riots and civil disorder in Alabama
White American riots in the United States
1920 murders in the United States
Deaths by firearm in Alabama
Lynching deaths in Alabama